The Norcroft C compiler (also referred to as the Norcroft compiler suite) in computing is a portable set of C/C++ programming tools written by Codemist, available for a wide range of processor architectures.

Norcroft C was developed by Codemist, established in November 1987 by a group of academics from the University of Cambridge and University of Bath; Arthur Norman, Alan Mycroft and John Fitch. Development took place from at least 1985; the company was dissolved in May 2016. The name Norcroft is derived from the original authors' surnames.

Supported architectures

Acorn C/C++ 

Acorn C/C++ was released for the  operating system, developed in collaboration with Acorn Computers.

INMOS Transputer C Compiler 

This compiler for the INMOS Transputer was developed in collaboration with Perihelion Software.

Cambridge Consultants XAP 

This compiler for Cambridge Consultants' XAP processor is another Norcroft compiler.

References

External links 
 Norcroft C Compiler at the Codemist website
 Acorn C/C++ Desktop Development Environment at the RISC OS Open website.

C (programming language) compilers
C++ compilers
Proprietary software